Arturo Rodríguez (born 15 December 1998) is a Mexican professional footballer who plays as a midfielder.

Career

Youth 
Rodriguez started his youth career with FC Dallas. However, his road through the academy system was not cut and dried. Rodriguez was actually rejected the first time he tried to join the FC Dallas academy. After this rejection, Rodriguez played for FC Dallas youth coach Victor Medina outside of the FC Dallas academy for three years. His career took off when Rodriguez starred for his club against professional youth sides from Mexico, like C.D. Guadalajara and Club León. From that point, Rodriguez signed for FC Dallas's academy in 2017. He helped the club win the prestigious Dallas Cup during his time with the academy.

Professional 
On January 31, 2019, Rodriguez signed his first professional contract with North Texas SC, the reserve team of FC Dallas, in USL League One. Rodriguez's younger brother, David Rodriguez, was also signed to a professional contract with the club. Rodriguez made his debut on March 30, 2019, in a 3–2 win against the Chattanooga Red Wolves. Rodriguez helped lead North Texas to the USL League One 2019 regular season and post-season championship, while becoming the league's assist leader with 10 assists and a leading MVP candidate. On October 31 and November 1, respectively, Rodriguez was named both the Young Player of the Year and the League's Most Valuable Player (MVP). He scored his first goal for the club on November 5, 2019, against fellow MLS reserve side Orlando City B.

Rodriguez signed with Phoenix Rising FC on December 8, 2020, and left on January 23, 2023.

Personal 
Arturo's younger brother David is also a professional footballer. He plays for Liga MX club Atlético San Luis.

Career statistics

Club

Honours
North Texas SC
USL League One Regular Season: 2019
USL League One Championship: 2019

Individual
USL League One Most Valuable Player: 2019
USL League One Young Player of the Year: 2019

References

External links
 
 
 Arturo Rodriguez at FC Dallas

1998 births
Living people
American soccer players
Mexican footballers
Mexican emigrants to the United States
Association football midfielders
North Texas SC players
Phoenix Rising FC players
Real Monarchs players
Soccer players from Texas
USL League One players
Footballers from San Luis Potosí